Marco Antonio González Heredia (born 26 May 1986) is a Chilean former footballer. 

He played as a forward for Coquimbo Unido.

References

External links
 Marco González at BDFA.com.ar 

1986 births
Living people
People from Punta Arenas
Chilean footballers
Club Deportivo Universidad Católica footballers
Unión San Felipe footballers
Coquimbo Unido footballers
Deportes Ovalle footballers
Chilean Primera División players
Primera B de Chile players
Tercera División de Chile players
Association football forwards